Lucki Camel Jr. (born May 30, 1996) known mononymously as Lucki (stylized in all caps), is an American rapper and record producer from Chicago, Illinois. He came to public attention in 2013 after releasing his debut project, Alternative Trap. He has now signed with record label Empire. He has been hailed as one of the most influential figures in underground hip-hop in recent years. Lucki's second studio album Flawless Like Me debuted at number 12 on the Billboard 200.

Early life

Lucki grew up on the West Side of Chicago, Illinois and listened to Erykah Badu, Prince, and The Notorious B.I.G. growing up; he cites Chief Keef, Future, and Babyface Ray as some of his current inspirations. Lucki started rapping in his freshman year of high school after praise from his close friends. Soon after, he dropped out of high school at the age of 16 to pursue music full-time.

Career

2012-2013: "Untouchable Lucki"
Lucki's debut single and music video "Untouchable Lucki" was produced and premiered by music blog ELEVATOR. Lucki's music was first brought to ELEVATOR co-founder Bryan Zawlocki's attention by Lucki's friends Antoinne Bryant and Kevin Wright Jr, who at the time were interns for ELEVATOR. ELEVATOR subsequently produced Lucki's first two music videos "Untouchable" and "Everything Outside", both directed by Bryan Zawlocki, alongside Antoinne Bryant and Kevin Wright Jr.

2013–2014: Alternative Trap and Body High
Teaming up with his close friend and producer Plu2o Nash and other producers, Lucki released his first project, titled Alternative Trap at the age of 17. Lucki garnered attention from multiple music blogs including Fake Shore Drive, ELEVATOR, Complex and Noisey, because of his distinct flow and cadence, most prominent on his lead single "Count on Me", which garnered over 700,000 views on YouTube.

After receiving attention from music blogs for his self-proclaimed "alternative trap" music, Lucki started receiving attention from other music artists as well. In July 2014, FKA Twigs collaborated with Lucki on a song titled "Ouch Ouch"; the collaboration was a celebration of Twigs' recent visit to Chicago, as she tends to collaborate with local artists when she travels.

August 2014 saw the release of his second project, Body High. Later on that month, Red Bull Sound Select released a track titled "Weightin' On", featuring Danny Brown, whom he met at SXSW when they both played Red Bull's Sound Select showcase.

In December 2014, Lucki collaborated with fellow Chicago musician Chance the Rapper and released a song titled "Stevie Wonder".

2015–2017: X, Freewave EP, Freewave 2, Watch My Back 
After releasing his first single to his third project titled X, Lucki continued to drop more songs from the mixtape in 2015; the other singles were "Lowlife" and "What I Wanna". Lucki released X on May 30, 2015, his 19th birthday.

A few months later, Lucki started releasing freestyles to his extended play Freewave EP. At first, they were single songs, but soon announced they were to be a part of the upcoming EP; he first released "Freewave Freestyle" and "Back Home", and soon followed with "Freewave 3, 4, 5, and 7". The EP consisted of ten songs, the tenth song titled "Rumors" was added a couple of weeks later.

In January 2016, Lucki announced his name change from Lucki Eck$ to Lucki when he released the first single to his then upcoming project, @ MIDNIGHT, titled "Deja Vu", featuring fellow Chicago rapper Joey Purp. Lucki claimed that the Eck$ moniker was "childish" and that he has "grown" from the name. On August 15, 2016 he released the Freewave 2 mixtape. This was followed by Watch My Back on December 1, 2017, which was supported by the popular single "Sunset".

2019-present: Freewave 3, Days B4 III, Wake Up Lucki and Flawless Like Me 
Lucki released his debut studio album Freewave 3 in February 2019 and notably included the song "More Than Ever". This was followed by Days B4 III on October 25 which had the popular song "4 The Betta". The project was his first charting project, debuting at number 188 on the Billboard 200. His fifth EP Almost There was released on May 29, 2020, acting as a placeholder for fans until his next project. On February 12, 2021, he released the single "Greed" with Lil Yachty. On November 18, 2021 he released the song "NEPTUNE V.S INDUSTRY" as the lead single to the collaborative album with producer F1lthy, Wake Up Lucki, which was released on December 3, 2021.

Throughout 2022, Lucki began releasing a number of singles, including the single "Super Urus," released February 18, 2022, "Y NOT?," released June 14, 2022, and "Coincidence," released August 19, 2022, which was accompanied by a music video directed by Cole Bennett. After many delays, Lucki released his second studio album, Flawless Like Me on September 23, 2022 and included guest appearances from Future and Babyface Ray. It became his highest charting project, debuting at number 12 on the Billboard 200. On January 20, 2023, he had a guest appearance on Trippie Redd's Mansion Musik album on the track "DIE DIE".

Discography

Studio albums

Extended plays

Mixtapes
 Alternative Trap (2013)
 Body High (2014)
 X (2015)
 Freewave 2 (as Luc) (2016)
 Watch My Back (2017)
 Days B4 III (2019)
 Almost There (2020)
 Wake Up Lucki (with F1lthy) (2021)

Singles

Guest appearances

References

1996 births
Living people
African-American male rappers
Rappers from Chicago
Alternative hip hop musicians
Midwest hip hop musicians
Songwriters from Illinois
African-American songwriters
Indie rappers
African-American record producers
American hip hop record producers
People from West Chicago, Illinois
21st-century American rappers
Record producers from Illinois
21st-century American male musicians
21st-century African-American musicians
American male songwriters